The Road to Dishonour (German: Der Weg zur Schande) is a 1930 British-German drama film directed by Richard Eichberg and starring Anna May Wong, Francis Lederer and Georg H. Schnell. It was made at Elstree Studios as part of a co-production deal between Eichberg and British International Pictures. Separate English-language (The Flame of Love) and French-language (Hai-Tang) were also made.

Cast
 Anna May Wong as Hai-Tang, Star einer chinesischen Gruppe  
 Francis Lederer as Leutnant Boris Borrisoff - German version 
 Georg H. Schnell as Großfürst Pawel - General-Gouverneur 
 Hermann Blaß
 Edith d'Amara as Yvette - Chansonette  
 Ley On as Wang-Hu - Hai-Tangs Bruder 
 Hugo Werner-Kahle as Oberst Morawjoff - Reg. Kmd. 
 Hay Yung as Dschung Dschou - der Älteste der Truppe

References

Bibliography
 Grange, William. Cultural Chronicle of the Weimar Republic. Scarecrow Press, 2008.

External links

1930 films
Films of the Weimar Republic
British drama films
1930 drama films
1930s German-language films
Films shot at British International Pictures Studios
Films directed by Richard Eichberg
German multilingual films
British multilingual films
Films set in Russia
Films set in the 1900s
German drama films
British black-and-white films
German black-and-white films
1930 multilingual films
1930s British films
1930s German films